Irwin Sobel (born September 12, 1940) is a scientist and researcher in digital image processing.

Biography 
Irwin Sobel was born in New York City.  He graduated from MIT in 1961 and did his Ph.D. research at the Stanford Artificial Intelligence Project (SAIL) with thesis Camera Models and Machine Perception.  He spent most of his career at HP Labs.

Sobel Operator
In 1968, Sobel gave a talk entitled "An Isotropic 3x3 Image Gradient Operator" at SAIL; this method became known as the Sobel operator. It should more appropriately be called the Sobel–Feldman operator since it was developed jointly with a colleague, Gary Feldman, also at SAIL.

References

1940 births
Computer scientists
Scientists from New York City
Massachusetts Institute of Technology alumni
Image processing
Digital imaging
Living people